Sphoeroides dorsalis, known as the marbled puffer, is a species of pufferfish in the family Tetraodontidae. It is native to the Western Atlantic, where it ranges from North Carolina to Suriname and occurs at a depth of 18 to 100 m (59 to 328 ft). It is a demersal oviparous species found over soft bottoms that reaches 20 cm (7.9 inches) in total length.

References 

Tetraodontidae
Fish described in 1934